David Ogilvie may refer to:

Dave Ogilvie, Canadian record producer and musician
David Ogilvie (cricketer) (born 1951), former Australian cricketer

See also
David Ogilvy (disambiguation)
Ogilvie (disambiguation)